José Ramón Rivero is a Venezuelan politician. He was the Minister of Work and Social Security from January 2007, replacing Ricardo Dorado, to April 2008. He was replaced by Roberto Manuel Hernández. The decision was related to Rivero's handling of the long-running negotiations between SIDOR's management and its workers. In April 2008 Hugo Chávez acquiesced to the workers' demands and ordered SIDOR to be nationalised.

Rivero was the leader of the FSBT (the Bolivarian Worker's Force), a current within the Unión Nacional de Trabajadores (UNT) union confederation which had previously existed in the Confederación de Trabajadores de Venezuela (CTV). Shortly before his dismissal Rivero publicly backed plans by the FSBT to form a rival union confederation.

References

External links
 José Ramon Rivero: “In Venezuela, we are going against the tide of neo-liberalism”, 10 August 2007

Living people
Members of the National Assembly (Venezuela)
Government ministers of Venezuela
Year of birth missing (living people)